The Portland Breakwater Lighthouse is a functioning lighthouse located at Portland Harbour, Isle of Portland, Dorset, England. It is situated on the southern end of the north-east breakwater.

The lighthouse, a white hexagonal cast-iron structure, was established in 1905. It was also provided with a fog bell, sounding once every ten seconds in foggy weather.

The light was originally lit by oil, later changed to gas and is today lit electrically with a modern LED lamp. The light was owned by the Admiralty, but managed by Trinity House (who, until the light was automated in the late 1960s, provided three resident keepers accommodated in a nearby dwelling on the breakwater).

The lighthouse was restored and repainted in 1995, prior to the closure of Portland Naval Base; subsequently, ownership of the lighthouse (along with the harbour as a whole) was vested in Portland Port Ltd, and the Portland Harbour Authority took over its management.

The lighthouse underwent restoration again in 2016. The lighthouse's current use continues to aid navigation of boats in the area, warning mariners of the breakwaters by giving a white flash every 10 seconds. Surrounding the lighthouse are various defensive buildings such as pillboxes.

The former optic from the lighthouse has been placed in Weymouth Museum.

Lighthouse Staff
In a 2005 newsletter of the South Dorset Amateur Radio, former keeper John Trotter recalled memories of the lighthouse:

See also

 List of lighthouses in England

References

External links

  Portland Port

1905 establishments in England
Lighthouses completed in 1905
Isle of Portland
Lighthouses in Dorset
Lighthouses of the English Channel
Towers in Dorset